Hafsa Sultan Caravanserai is a 16th-century caravansarai in Marmaris ilçe (district) of Muğla Province, southwestern Turkey.

History
Caravanserais were medieval-age inns in the Islamic countries. Marmaris Caravanserai was commissioned by the Ottoman sultan Suleiman the Magnificent (reigned 1520–1566) during his campaign to Rhodes in 1522–23. In this campaign, the main Anatolian base of the Ottoman army was in Marmaris. The building, with one big and seven small rooms, was constructed to serve as headquarters. Following the conquest of the island, the building was transformed into a caravanserai. According to the inscription of the building, it was opened to service in 1545. It was named after Suleiman's mother Hafsa Sultan (1479–1534).

Modern usage
Currently, the caravanserai is a private property and its rooms have been rented to touristic shops and taverns. However it is planned to restore the building and transform it to a museum.

References

Caravanserais in Turkey
Buildings and structures in Muğla Province
Marmaris
Buildings and structures of the Ottoman Empire
Buildings and structures completed in 1545
Ottoman caravanserais